Jeb Stuart Magruder (November 5, 1934May 11, 2014) was an American businessman and high-level political operative in the Republican Party who served time in prison for his role in the Watergate scandal. 

He served President Richard Nixon in various capacities, including acting as deputy director of the president's 1972 re-election campaign, Committee for the Re-Election of the President (CRP). In August 1973, Magruder pleaded guilty to one count of conspiracy to wiretap, obstruct justice and defraud the United States. He served seven months in federal prison.

Magruder later attended Princeton Theological Seminary and was ordained as a Presbyterian minister. He spoke publicly about ethics and his role in the Watergate scandal. In the 1990s and early 2000s, he gave interviews in which he changed his accounts of actions by various participants in the Watergate coverup, including claiming that President Richard Nixon ordered the break-ins.

Early life

Jeb Stuart Magruder was born and grew up on Staten Island, New York. His father, a Civil War buff, named him for Confederate general J.E.B. Stuart. His great-grandfather smuggled shoes for the Civil War Confederate States of America. His grandfather was convicted of bank fraud related to the construction of WWI cargo ships. He was an honor student at Curtis High School. Magruder was an excellent junior tennis player and swimmer, among the best in the greater New York area.

After two years at Williams College, he served in the U.S. Army, but was kicked out of Officer Candidate School of the United States Army, only weeks before graduation, going AWOL, by not going to class so as to take the daughter of a colonel out in a new Chevrolet.
 He was then was stationed in South Korea. He later earned a Bachelor of Arts in political science in 1958 from Williams College, where he competed on the varsity swimming team and set several regional records.

Magruder started at IBM after college, but dropped out of its training program after only a few days. He went to California and married a Berkeley student, Gail Barnes Nicholas, then took a job with the Crown Zellerbach, selling paper goods in Kansas City. Later, he started his own consumer products company. Later, he earned a Master of Business Administration degree from the University of Chicago.

Marriage and family
He married Gail Barnes Nicholas on October 17, 1959, in Brentwood, California. The couple had four children. They were divorced in 1984.

Magruder married Patricia Newton on February 28, 1987, in Columbus, Ohio, and adopted her two children. They were divorced in May 2003.

Business career and politics
In the late 1950s, Magruder moved to Kansas City with Jewel Tea, in a transfer for work. He became involved there as a campaign manager for the Republican Party during the 1960 election campaign, working as chairman of an urban ward.

Magruder moved to Chicago for his MBA studies. Afterward he shifted from IBM to the consulting firm Booz Allen Hamilton. 

In Chicago, he again, was involved with the Republican Party. Magruder was a ward chairman, for Donald Rumsfelds 1962 Illinois's 13th congressional district United States House of Representatives Republican primary campaign. Rumsfeld won the primary and the seat in Congress.

In 1962 Magruder moved from Booz Allen Hamilton to Jewel, a regional grocery firm. During his nearly four years with them, he was promoted to merchandise manager.

Magruder became involved with the Illinois organization of the Barry Goldwater presidential campaign in late 1963, but became disillusioned with Goldwater's political views. He worked briefly as campaign manager for Richard Ogilvie's 1966 campaign for president of the Cook County Board of Supervisors. The political workload, combined with work pressures, caused Magruder to end employment with Jewel.

In mid-1966, he returned to California, to begin a job with the Broadway Stores. In mid-1967, he served as Southern California coordinator for the Richard Nixon presidential campaign. He left early in 1968 due to internal organizational problems.

Magruder entered partnership during early 1969 with two other entrepreneurs to start two new businesses, and became president and chief executive officer of these firms.

Joins White House staff
Magruder was appointed to the White House staff in 1969, as special assistant to the president, and moved with his family to Washington, D.C. He worked for Nixon operatives H.R. Haldeman and Herbert G. Klein, communications director for the Executive Branch. Magruder's formal title was deputy director of White House Communications.

Committee to Re-elect the President

Magruder served in the White House until the spring of 1971, when he left to manage the Committee for the Re-Election of the President (CRP, also known as CREEP), first as director. By early 1972 in the election year, Attorney General John N. Mitchell took over as director of CREEP and Magruder acted as his deputy. As Mitchell became preoccupied with a scandal involving the ITT Corporation and by his efforts to restrain his outspoken wife Martha, Magruder took on more of the management of the CREEP.

The 1972 campaign to re-elect the President won 49 of 50 states. Nixon lost only Massachusetts and the District of Columbia to Democrat George McGovern. The final tally of Nixon's victory was 520 to 17 electoral votes, the second largest Electoral College (United States) margin in history up until then, after Franklin D. Roosevelt's 1936 victory over Alf Landon, (523 to 8).

Manages 1973 Inaugural
Magruder worked as inaugural director from October 1972 to arrange Richard Nixon's United States presidential inauguration ceremony and celebration in January 1973. In March 1973, he began a job as director of policy planning with the United States Department of Commerce. He resigned soon afterward, as the Watergate scandal began to heat up and become scrutinized again by media following James McCord's disclosures of perjury during the original Watergate trial of the five burglars; the former Watergate burglar wrote about this to the Washington Star.

Watergate scandal
Magruder, in his role with CREEP, was involved with the Watergate matters from an early stage, including its planning, execution, and cover-up.

Liddy plan
Magruder met with White House Counsel John Dean and John N. Mitchell (Attorney General of the United States and director of CREEP) on January 27 and February 4, 1972, to review preliminary plans by G. Gordon Liddy (Counsel to CREEP) for intelligence gathering ideas for the 1972 campaign. The Watergate burglaries would evolve from those meetings. From the day they met in December 1971, Magruder and Liddy (who had been hired by Mitchell and Dean) had a conflicted personal relationship.

Cooperates with prosecutors
During April 1973, Magruder began cooperating with federal prosecutors. In exchange, Magruder was allowed to plead guilty in August 1973 to a one-count indictment of conspiracy to obstruct justice, to defraud the United States, and to illegally eavesdrop on the Democratic Party's national headquarters at the Watergate Hotel. On May 21, 1974, Magruder was sentenced by Judge John Sirica to ten months to four years for his role in the failed burglary of Watergate and the following cover-up. After his sentencing, Magruder said, "I am confident that this country will survive its Watergates and its Jeb Magruders." In the end, he served three months of his sentence at a Federal minimum security prison in Allenwood, Pennsylvania, and was moved for the remaining four months (before Sirica's pardon) to a "safe house prison" at the Fort Holabird Base in Baltimore Harbor, along with Chuck Colson, John Dean and Herb Kalmbach, due to threats on the four by inmates at Allenwood.

Magruder originally testified that he knew nothing to indicate that President Nixon had any prior knowledge of the Watergate burglary.

In his book, An American Life: One Man's Road to Watergate (1974), he wrote, 
I know nothing to indicate that Nixon was aware in advance of the plan to break into the Democratic headquarters. It is possible that Mitchell or Haldeman told him in advance, but I think it's likelier that they would not have mentioned it unless the operation had produced some results of interest to him. This book was published before Magruder's sentencing on May 21, and before Nixon resigned as the president.

Magruder had testified that he thought that he was helping establish a legal intelligence-gathering operation. In his book Magruder wrote about former attorney general John Mitchell and Fred LaRue meeting in late March 1972 in Key Biscayne, Florida. He wrote that Mitchell approved the plan to eavesdrop on the Watergate complex soon after this meeting.

After Watergate
After his prison term, Magruder began a speaking tour on college campuses and in other public spaces, inspiring some critics to suggest he had profited from the scandal and his decision to turn state's evidence. He published a Christian-oriented memoir, From Power to Peace in 1976. He earned a Master of Divinity (M.Div.) degree from Princeton Theological Seminary in 1981 and became ordained as a Presbyterian minister. He served as associate minister at the First Presbyterian Church in Burlingame, California and First Community Church of Columbus, Ohio. (While there, Magruder chaired that city's Commission on Ethics and Values for a time.) In May 1983, President Ronald Reagan denied a request from Magruder for a presidential pardon.

In 1990 Magruder was called as senior pastor at the First Presbyterian Church of Lexington, Kentucky. In 1995, Kentucky Governor Brereton Jones reinstated Magruder's right to campaign for public office in the state.

Continued controversy
In 1990 Magruder consented to interviews with authors Len Colodny and Robert Gettlin while the two were conducting research for their 1991 book Silent Coup: The Removal of a President (St. Martin's Press). Magruder admitted that he had lied to prosecutors, to the Senate's Watergate Committee, and in his 1974 book An American Life: One Man's Road to Watergate, concerning aspects of the early cover-up.

To Colodny and Gettlin, he said that he had called John Dean several hours after the (second) Watergate break-in was discovered, and that Dean set in motion several cover-up strategies. This version of events tallied closely with that of Gordon Liddy, as set out in his 1980 book Will. Books published earlier by others, however, such as Magruder's in 1974 and Dean's Blind Ambition (1976), had become the accepted 'truth' of the cover-up. These versions had very profound and damaging effects on the reputations of senior figures such as H.R. Haldeman, John Ehrlichman, and John N. Mitchell.

To Colodny and Gettlin, Magruder admitted specifically instructing Liddy on the second Watergate break-in, something which he had earlier denied. At the time these interviews were conducted, Magruder was a Presbyterian minister in Columbus, Ohio.

In 2003 Magruder was interviewed again, by PBS researchers and the Associated Press. According to his account in a PBS documentary, Watergate Plus 30: Shadow of History, and in an interview with the Associated Press, he asserted that Nixon knew about the Watergate burglary early in the process, and well before the scandal broke. During the 2003 interviews, Magruder said that he had attended a meeting with Mitchell on March 30, 1972, at which he heard Nixon tell Mitchell by telephone to begin the Watergate plan. This account, however, has been contested by Fred LaRue. LaRue, who was the only other person present at the meeting in which the alleged telephone call from Nixon to Mitchell occurred, has said that no telephone call from Nixon to Mitchell took place during this meeting. Magruder is the only direct participant of the scandal to claim that President Nixon had specific prior knowledge of the Watergate burglary, and that Nixon directed Mitchell to proceed with the burglary. These statements contradict Magruder's earlier accounts that the cover-up had reached no higher in the Administration than Mitchell.

In his 1974 book, Magruder had said that the only telephone call from the White House during this meeting came from H.R. Haldeman's aide, Gordon C. Strachan. Sixteen years later, in the August 7, 1990 interview with Colodny and Gettlin, Magruder changed his account, claiming that the telephone call from the White House came from Haldeman himself. In 2003, Magruder changed his account again, saying that President Nixon had telephoned Mitchell at the Key Biscayne meeting.

Later years
Magruder retired first to Colorado Springs and later to the Short North area of Columbus Ohio. On July 23, 2007, Magruder was hospitalized after crashing his car into a motorcycle and a truck on State Route 315 in Columbus Ohio. It was reported that Magruder had suffered a stroke while driving. He was charged with failure to maintain an assured clear distance and failure to stop after an accident or collision. Magruder pleaded guilty in January 2008 to a charge of reckless operation stemming from the crashes with two vehicles in July. His license was suspended and he was fined $300.

Death
Magruder moved to be near family in Danbury, Connecticut in 2012, and died at age 79 on May 11, 2014, due to complications from a stroke.

References

Sources
 
 Len Colodny and Robert Gettlin, Silent Coup: The Removal of a President, New York: St. Martin's Press, 1991
 Jeb Stuart Magruder, An American Life: One Man's Road to Watergate, New York 1974, Atheneum
published before Magruder's sentencing on May 21, and before Nixon's resignation.

1934 births
2014 deaths
American memoirists
American Presbyterians
IBM employees
Members of the Committee for the Re-Election of the President
People convicted of obstruction of justice
People from Staten Island
Princeton Theological Seminary alumni
United States Army soldiers
University of Chicago alumni
Williams College alumni
New York (state) Republicans
Kentucky Republicans
California Republicans
Ohio Republicans
Military personnel from New York City
Writers from New York City
Curtis High School alumni
People convicted in the Watergate scandal